Fatehgarh railway station is a small railway station in Farrukhabad district, Uttar Pradesh. Its code is FGR. It serves Fatehgarh city. The station consists of two platforms. The platforms are not well sheltered. It lacks many facilities including water and sanitation.

References

Railway stations in Farrukhabad district
Izzatnagar railway division